John T. Morgan (c. 1830 – September 14, 1910) was a justice of the Idaho Territorial Supreme Court from June 10, 1879 to August 14, 1885, and of the Idaho Supreme Court from 1890 to 1896, serving as chief justice from 1895 to 1896.

Early life, education, and military service
Born in Hamburg, Erie County, New York, Morgan was the third son of James Clark Morgan, a farmer who served as justice of the peace for many years. Morgan accompanied his parents to Illinois in 1843, then a largely undeveloped state. He was raised on a farm, attended the public schools of Monmouth, Illinois, and afterward engaged in teaching school in order to continue his own education. In 1852 he entered Lombard University in Galesburg, Illinois, graduating in 1855. He read law in the office of General Eleazer A. Paine, afterward a prominent brigadier general in the Union Army, and remained in that office for three years. He then entered the law department of Albany University, New York, and later continued his studies in the State Law School then located in Poughkeepsie, New York, where he was graduated in 1856, with the degree of Bachelor of Law.

In 1856 he entered the practice of law in Monmouth, Illinois, and "soon secured a large and distinctively representative clientele". On August 11, 1862, he enlisted to fight in the American Civil War with Company F, 83rd Illinois Infantry Regiment. Governor Richard Yates commissioned the raising of the company, and Morgan was elected its captain, in which capacity he served until the close of the war, when he received an honorable discharge on June 26, 1865. While in the service he was for two years provost marshal, stationed at Clarksville, Tennessee, where he had charge of all the abandoned and contraband goods, houses and lands of all persons who had joined the rebel army in that vicinity.

Political and judicial service
Returning to Illinois, Morgan resumed the practice of law in Monmouth. In 1867 he was appointed registrar in bankruptcy, filling the office until 1879. During this period, he became active in politics. In 1870 he was elected to the Illinois House of Representatives, in which he served for two years. In 1874 he was elected to the Illinois State Senate, serving until 1878. Morgan was a Republican. On June 26, 1879, President Rutherford B. Hayes appointed Morgan chief justice of the territorial Supreme Court of Idaho, presiding over that court and serving as ex-officio judge of the district court for the southeastern part of the state. Morgan was reappointed to that seat by President Chester A. Arthur, and filled that position until 1885, when he was removed by President Grover Cleveland.

Morgan resumed the practice of law in Boise, Idaho, and developed a large clientele throughout the eastern part of the state. He supported Idaho's admission to the Union, and when it became necessary to frame a state constitution he was elected a member of the convention for that purpose, and chaired the committee on the legislative department. In October, 1890, he was elected one of the justices of the Supreme Court of Idaho, serving until March 4, 1897, when he again resumed his law practice. In 1902, Morgan published a booklet advising prospectors of where mining claims could be found in one region of Idaho.

Personal life and death
In November, 1858, Morgan married Maria Horroun of Pennsylvania, with whom he had four children.

Morgan died in his home in Boise, following a paralytic stroke, and was memorialized in the reports of the Idaho Supreme Court the following year.

References

1830s births
1910 deaths
People from Hamburg, New York
People of Illinois in the American Civil War
Lombard College alumni
University at Albany, SUNY alumni
Union Army officers
Republican Party members of the Illinois House of Representatives
Republican Party Illinois state senators
United States Article I federal judges appointed by Rutherford B. Hayes
United States Article I federal judges appointed by Chester A. Arthur
Justices of the Idaho Supreme Court